The Madonna del Granduca is a Madonna painting by the Italian renaissance artist Raphael. It was probably painted in 1505, shortly after Raphael had arrived in Florence. The influence of Leonardo da Vinci, whose works he got to know there, can be seen in the use of sfumato. The painting belonged to Ferdinand III, Grand Duke of Tuscany, from whom it got its name.

See also
List of paintings by Raphael

Notes

References

External links
 

1505 paintings
Paintings of the Madonna and Child by Raphael
Paintings in the collection of the Galleria Palatina
Nude art